Hannah Elfner (born Hannah Petersen; October 12, 1982) is a German physicist who is Head of Simulations at the Helmholtz Centre for Heavy Ion Research and Professor of Physics at the Goethe University Frankfurt. She was named the 2021 Alfons and Gertrud Kassel Foundation Scientist of the Year.

Early life and education 
Hannah Petersen was a physics student at the Goethe University Frankfurt. She graduated in 2006, and remained at Goethe for her doctoral research supported by Deutsche Telekom. Her doctoral research involved an integrated Boltzmann approach to the collisions of heavy ions. Heavy ion conditions give rise to a strongly interacting state matter known as the quark–gluon plasma, which is similar to the matter founded in the moments following the Big Bang. Within this phase, the plasma expands explosively at extremely high pressure. Petersen was amongst the first researchers to recognise that the pathway of these explosions was impacted by density and temperature. After earning her doctorate she joined Duke University as a Alexander von Humboldt Foundation Feodor Lynen fellow.

Research and career 
Elfner develops dynamical computation simulations to better understand high energy conditions and the quark–gluon plasma. She became interested in the influence of the initial and final states on the trajectory of heavy ion collisions. To quantitatively evaluate the impact of these boundary conditions, she adopted an event-by-event strategy that makes use of transport theory. She developed a hadronic transport approach known as SMASH (Simulating Many Accelerated Strongly-interacting Hadrons). SMASH is part of the National Science Foundation JETSCAPE framework. Her model predicted that the dynamics and viscosity of the plasma depends on the initial state and any quantum fluctuations.

In 2011, Elfner was appointed a Visiting Professor at Duke University where she was based in the quantum chromodynamics group. She decided to return to Germany because of the creation of the accelerator FAIR (Facility for Antiproton and Ion Research). She was appointed a Helmholtz Young Investigator in 2012, and a research Fellow at the Frankfurt Institute for Advanced Studies the following year. She was one of the youngest researchers to ever be appointed Professor in Germany.

Elfner was made Head of Simulations at the Helmholtz Centre for Heavy Ion Research in 2018.

Awards and honors 
 2016 German Research Foundation Heinz Maier-Leibnitz-Prize
 2018 Quark Matter Zimanyi Medal
 2021 Alfons and Gertrud Kassel Foundation Scientist of the Year

Selected publications

References 

1982 births
Duke University fellows
German women physicists
Goethe University Frankfurt alumni
Academic staff of Goethe University Frankfurt
Living people
21st-century German physicists